Nestlé Rossiya is a Russian company that manufactures confectioneries, chocolate, and other products such as prepared foods, dairy products, ice cream, beverages, infant foods, and pet care products. It is based in Moscow, Russia and was established in 1871.

Nestlé Rossiya is a subsidiary company of Nestlé S.A. The company's former name was Nestlé Food LLC, and it was renamed to Nestlé Rossiya in 2007.

See also
 List of companies of Russia

References

External links
 Nestlé Rossiya, LLC. Corprussia.com.

Russian chocolate companies
Confectionery companies
Food and drink companies based in Moscow
Manufacturing companies based in Moscow
Manufacturing companies established in 1871
Nestlé
Russian subsidiaries of foreign companies
1871 establishments in the Russian Empire